Daniel Filip Mašulovič (born 30 January 1998) is a Slovak footballer who currently plays for SV Wimpassing as a defender.

Club career

ŠK Slovan Bratislava
Mašulovič made his Fortuna Liga debut for Slovan Bratislava on 27 May 2017 against Zemplín Michalovce.

References

External links
 ŠK Slovan Bratislava official club profile
 
 Futbalnet profile

1998 births
Living people
Footballers from Bratislava
Slovak footballers
Association football defenders
ŠK Slovan Bratislava players
SC Ritzing players
FK Senica players
RSC Hamsik Academy players
2. Liga (Slovakia) players
Slovak Super Liga players
Austrian Landesliga players
Expatriate footballers in Austria
Slovak expatriate sportspeople in Austria